A culture minister or a heritage minister is a common cabinet position in governments. The culture minister is typically responsible for cultural policy, which often includes arts policy (direct and indirect support to artists and arts organizations) and measures to protect the national heritage of a country and cultural expression of a country or subnational region. This responsibility usually manifests in the accompanying ministry (also called a "department"), governing the following:

 an official registry of protected historic sites and other sites of cultural importance
 maintaining national archives of cultural work, including public museums, galleries and libraries
 creating a department or ministry of culture or arts
 creating arts councils, which disburse funding to artists and arts organization
 providing funding to artists and arts institutions

In some countries or subnational jurisdictions (e.g., provinces or regions), the minister of culture may also be responsible for sport, youth issues, or tourism (e.g., in Turkey). In a few cases, the minister of culture is also responsible for foreign affairs (e.g., in Scotland), education (e.g., Hungary, Iceland and Indonesia), science and technology policy (e.g., Japan), communications/media (Singapore and UK), or a geographical area associated with national heritage (e.g., Ireland).

Terminology
A culture minister may also be called a cultural minister, minister of culture, minister for culture, minister of cultural affairs, minister of arts, minister of heritage, secretary of culture or secretary of state of culture.

See also 
 Ministry of Education and Culture
 Minister (government)

References

 
Culture